Thana Alexa (born Thana Alexa Pavelić; born March 19, 1987) is an American jazz vocalist, composer, arranger and producer.

Biography

Early life
Alexa's interest in music began at age three when she disappeared from a birthday party and was discovered in the basement playing melodies to simple songs on a toy piano. She soon expressed a preference for the violin, and began taking lessons. Although she began to sing during this period, she believed the violin to be her primary instrument and considered pursuing it vocationally.

After elementary school, Alexa's family moved back to Croatia. She began singing songs in English as a way of maintaining her connection to her mother tongue and her childhood in the United States. In Zagreb, Alexa took voice lessons at the Rock Academy. Musician and club owner Boško Petrović mentored her – she began attending regional jazz workshops and performing professionally, including at Croatian festivals.

Alexa studied psychology at Northeastern University before transferring to the New School in New York City; she completed her psychology degree and received a fine arts degree in jazz performance. She cites drummer Bernard Purdie as a mentor during this time.

Music career
Her first album as a leader, Ode to Heroes, was released by Jazz Village. She appears on guitarist Gene Ess's album Absurdist Theatre. Alexa has also collaborated with vibraphonist Christos Rafalides. Her 2020 album ONA went on to gain two Grammy nominations, including Best Jazz Vocal Album and Best Improvised Jazz Solo for Regina Carter.

Awards and honors
Thana Alexa and husband/ collaborator Antonio Sanchez shared the cover of DownBeat Magazine in the May 2020 issue. For four consecutive years, Alexa has also appeared in the DownBeat magazine Critics' Poll for Rising Female Vocalist. She was runner-up in the 2014 Made in New York Jazz Competition.

Discography

As leader
 Ode to Heroes (Jazz Village, 2015)
 ONA (Self Release, 2020)

As guest
With Antonio Sanchez
 New Life (CAM Jazz, 2013)
 The Meridian Suite (CAM Jazz, 2015)
 Lines in the Sand (CAM Jazz, 2018)

With Gene Ess
 Fractal Attraction (SIMP, 2013)
 Eternal Monolith (SIMP, 2015)
 Absurdist Theatre (SIMP, 2016)
 Apotheosis (SIMP, 2018)

With others
 Matija Dedic, Friends (Dallas, 2010)

References

External links 

1987 births
Living people
American women jazz singers
American jazz singers
American people of Croatian descent
Croatian jazz musicians
Women jazz musicians
21st-century Croatian women singers
21st-century American women singers
21st-century American singers